Statistics of Swedish football Division 2 for the 1934–35 season.

League standings

Division 2 Norra 1934–35 
Teams from a large part of northern Sweden, approximately above the province of Medelpad, were not allowed to play in the national league system until the 1953–54 season, and a championship was instead played to decide the best team in Norrland.

Division 2 Östra 1934–35

Division 2 Västra 1934–35

Division 2 Södra 1934–35

References
Sweden - List of final tables (Clas Glenning)

Swedish Football Division 2 seasons
2
Sweden